My Kinda Girl may refer to:
 My Kinda Girl (Raghav song)
 My Kinda Girl (Babyface song)

See also
 My Kind of Girl, a 1961 song by Matt Monro
 My Kind of Girl (Collin Raye song)